Tyrosine-protein kinase receptor TYRO3 is an enzyme that in humans is encoded by the TYRO3 gene.

Interactions 

TYRO3 has been shown to interact with:
 GAS6, and
 PIK3R1

References

Further reading